Forest Township is a civil township of Missaukee County in the U.S. state of Michigan. The population was 1,157 at the 2010 census.

Geography

Highways
 does not enter the township but has its eastern terminus at the township boundary with M-66.
 forms almost all of the southern boundary of the township.
 forms the entire western boundary of the township.

Demographics
As of the census of 2000, there were 1,082 people, 431 households, and 305 families residing in the township. There were 678 housing units at an average density of 19.3 per square mile (7.4/km2). The racial makeup of the township was 98.06% White, 0.37% Native American, and 1.57% from two or more races. Hispanic or Latino of any race were 0.74% of the population.

There were 431 households, out of which 31.6% had children under the age of 18 living with them, 56.4% were married couples living together, 9.7% had a female householder with no husband present, and 29.2% were non-families. 23.4% of all households were made up of individuals, and 9.5% had someone living alone who was 65 years of age or older.  The average household size was 2.48 and the average family size was 2.86.

In the township the population was spread out, with 26.1% under the age of 18, 7.3% from 18 to 24, 29.4% from 25 to 44, 23.9% from 45 to 64, and 13.3% who were 65 years of age or older.  The median age was 38 years. For every 100 females, there were 98.2 males.  For every 100 females age 18 and over, there were 94.6 males.

The median income for a household in the township was $33,359, and the median income for a family was $38,047. Males had a median income of $30,912 versus $20,375 for females. The per capita income for the township was $15,417.  About 10.0% of families and 11.3% of the population were below the poverty line, including 14.1% of those under age 18 and 16.0% of those age 65 or over.

References

Townships in Missaukee County, Michigan
Townships in Michigan
Populated places established in 1879
1879 establishments in Michigan